Nilaje is a railway station on the Vasai–Diva–Panvel–Roha route of the Central Line, of the Mumbai Suburban Railway network.

The surrounding nearby villages and its distance from Nilje are Ghesar 0.4 km, Vadavli Kh 1.6 km, Hedutane 2.5 km, Gharivali 2.6 km, Usarghar 2.8 km, Sandap 3.7 km, Bhopar 4.9 km, Davdi 6.0 km, Rohan 6.5 km, Golvali 6.6 km, Pisvali 8.3 km, Mharal 12.4 km, Nandivli Tarfe Ambernath 12.6 km.

Surrounding areas include CasaRio, CasaRio Gold, Lodha Heaven, Casabella, Casabella Gold, Lodha Golflink & CasaPasio which is a part of Palava City developed by Lodha Builders.

Nilaje has a post office which is located in the heart of the village. Nilaje post office serves the surrounding areas such as Kolegoan, Ghesar, Katai, and other nearby areas.

This station is linked up to 2 junctions- Kopar & Diva. Trains towards Vasai cross Kopar while other trains cross Diva. Train schedule is given below. Served by both Passenger & MEMU Trains this station offers an easy connectivity to South Mumbai via Central / Western Lines.	The Southern line joins with Panvel Junction. Demands are currently on for launching EMU services. There are 3 platforms, all 3 are electrified.

Now with the UTS Mobile App tickets can be booked without queue.
First Train to Diva is at 0512 & last train is 1933
First Train from Diva is at 0625 & last train is 00:30

There are 13 services in both directions daily- services are provided by Konkan Railway, Central railway & Western railway The station is also linked by a KDMC midi bus service to Ghansoli

Gallery

Railway stations in Thane district
Mumbai Suburban Railway stations
Mumbai CR railway division
Diva-Panvel rail line